Toronto was an Ontario provincial electoral district that existed from 1886 to 1894. It was created by merging Toronto West and Toronto East ridings into one large riding covering the entire city.

It was abolished prior to the 1894 election when it was split into four new ridings - Toronto North, Toronto South, Toronto East and Toronto West.

The Toronto district elected three members. In each election voters were allowed to cast two votes; they were allowed to vote for two candidates (Limited voting). The three candidates with the most votes were the winners. Parties did not run more than two candidates, for fear of splitting their votes, so mixed representation was produced in each contest in the Toronto district in 1886 and 1890.(No one party took all the seats.)

Members of Provincial Parliament

Election results
The first three candidates in the poll were elected to the legislature.
Percentage of votes received does not indicate percentage of voters who favoured the candidate because most or all of the Toronto voters cast two votes.

By-elections
These by-elections were held to replace members who had died in office. In each case only one member was elected for replacement.

References

Notes

Citations

Former provincial electoral districts of Ontario
Provincial electoral districts of Toronto